Piroska Szamoránsky (born 9 July 1986) is a former Hungarian handball player.

Career

Club
As a child she practiced aerobic, jazz ballet and rope skipping. She caught the fancy of handball around 1995, by watching matches in TV, and that time she determined to pursue a professional handball career.

She started to play in the Balázs Béla ÁMK under Zoltán Basák, and when she began her highschool studies, she has already signed a contract with Győri ETO KC. Szamoránsky came through the ranks quickly, having won the national championship both on youth and junior level and later with the first team as well. However, in 2005, after Győr player policy slightly favoured the older and more experienced players against youngsters, the pivot decided to leave the club.

Éva Szarka, the coach of Ferencvárosi TC, immediately swooped down on the talented line player, who became an integral part of the team that copped the league title in 2007. After a short spell in Montenegro, she re-signed to the club in June 2010.

International
Szamoránsky debuted in the national team on 4 April 2006 against Norway. Yet in that year she participated in the European Championship, finishing in fifth place. She represented Hungary in two more European Championships (2008, 2010) and in a World Championship (2007). She was also member of the Hungarian team that finished fourth in the 2008 Summer Olympics.

Personal
She has a twin sister, Anikó, also a professional handballer, who just like Piroska, plays as a line player.

Achievements
Nemzeti Bajnokság I:
Winner: 2005, 2007
Silver Medalist: 2004, 2006, 2009, 2012
Bronze Medalist: 2008, 2011
Magyar Kupa:
Silver Medllist: 2007
Montenegrin Championship:
Winner: 2010
Montenegrin Cup:
Winner: 2010
EHF Cup:
Winner: 2006
EHF Cup Winners' Cup:
Winner: 2010, 2011, 2012
Semifinalist: 2007
EHF Champions Trophy:
Fourth Placed: 2006
European Championship:
Bronze Medalist: 2012

Individual awards
 Team of the Tournament Pivot of the Baia Mare Champions Trophy: 2014

References

External links

Profile on Ferencvárosi TC Official Website
Career statistics at Worldhandball

1986 births
Living people
Hungarian female handball players
Sportspeople from Győr
Handball players at the 2008 Summer Olympics
Olympic handball players of Hungary
Expatriate handball players
Hungarian expatriates in Montenegro
Győri Audi ETO KC players
Hungarian people of Ukrainian descent
Ferencvárosi TC players (women's handball)